The Workers' Revolutionary Party is a Trotskyist political party in Peru founded in 1978 by a fraction of PST, FIR(IV) and FIR(Combate).  Its founding leaders included Hugo Blanco, Hipólito Enríquez, Raúl Castro Vera and Nicolás Lucar.  It participated in the general elections 1980 and the municipal elections 1980 and 1983.

PRT is currently led by Raúl Castro Vera.

The PRT became the Pervuvian section of reunified Fourth International but, in the 1980s, the Fourth Internationals in Peru joined the Partido Unificado Mariateguista.

Political parties established in 1978
Communist parties in Peru
Trotskyist organisations in Peru